Libor Wälzer (born December 8, 1975 in Sokolov) is a Czech weightlifter. Walzer represented the Czech Republic at the 2008 Summer Olympics in Beijing, where he competed for the men's heavyweight category (105 kg). Walzer was later elevated to a higher position, when Ukraine's Ihor Razoronov had been disqualified from the Olympics, after he tested positive for nandrolone.

References

External links
NBC 2008 Olympics profile

1975 births
Living people
Czech male weightlifters
Olympic weightlifters of the Czech Republic
Weightlifters at the 2008 Summer Olympics
Czech sportspeople in doping cases
People from Sokolov
Sportspeople from the Karlovy Vary Region